The 2005 Medibank International was a tennis tournament played on outdoor hard courts. It was the 113th edition of the Medibank International, and part of the ATP World Tour 250 series of the 2005 ATP Tour, and of the WTA Premier tournaments of the 2005 WTA Tour. It was the 113th edition of the tournament and both the men's and the women's events took place at the NSW Tennis Centre in Sydney, Australia, from 9 to 15 January 2005.

Finals

Men's singles

 Lleyton Hewitt defeated  Ivo Minář, 7–5, 6–0

Women's singles

 Alicia Molik defeated  Samantha Stosur, 6–7, 6–4, 7–5

Men's doubles

 Mahesh Bhupathi /  Todd Woodbridge defeated  Arnaud Clément /  Michaël Llodra, 6–3, 6–3

Women's doubles

 Bryanne Stewart /  Samantha Stosur defeated  Elena Dementieva /  Ai Sugiyama, walkover

External links
ATP Singles draw
WTA Singles and Doubles draws

 
Medibank International, 2005